Los elegidos is a Mexican television series produced by Sony Pictures Television and Televisa based on the 2010 Spanish television series created by Darío Madrona and Ruth García, Los protegidos. The series stars Sara Maldonado and Carlos Ferro. The series revolves around a group of people who pretend to be a family with the aim of fleeing from a strange organization that seeks them for the supernatural powers that the kids' possess. It premiered on 1 July 2019 and ended on 16 August 2019.

Premise 
The García García family hides two secrets. One is that they are actually not a family and the second is that the children and young people that comprise it have extraordinary abilities. They must hide to protect themselves from the sinister Colonel Morrison, a former US military man who wishes to use their powers for the benefit of his diabolical plans.

Cast 
 Sara Maldonado as Jimena García, a psychologist who will help Los elegidos after her daughter is kidnapped.
 Carlos Ferro as Mario García, a man who makes facial composite drawings, although his dream is to be an illustrator of books. He is Carlos's father.
 Julio Bracho as Thomas Morrison "El Coronel"
 Carmen Madrid as Rosa Domínguez
 Arantza Ruíz as Becka
 Macarena García as Sandra García, a teenager from a wealthy family whose power is electricity, which puts her in several problems.
 Erick Cañete as Lucas García, a shy and withdrawn teen whose power is shapeshifting.
 Jason Romo as Felipe García "Cobra", a problematic teen who lives in litigation with his father. His power is invisibility.
 Mario Escalante as Ismael Murillo
 Gerardo Trejoluna as Antonio Domínguez
 Cinthia Vázquez as Nuria
 Clarisa González as Claudia Domínguez
 Maximiliano Uribe as Carlos García, his power is telekinesis, suffers from bullying at school, and loves his father's stories and comics.
 Paola Real as Lucía García, her power is mind-reading and is always listening to classical music to avoid knowing the thoughts of others.
 Cassandra Iturralde as Blanca
 Lukas Urquijo López as Beto
 José Antonio Toledano as Ángel
 Javier Ponce as Leo

Episodes 

Notes

Awards and nominations

References

External links 
 

Mexican telenovelas
2019 telenovelas
2019 Mexican television series debuts
2019 Mexican television series endings
Televisa telenovelas
Spanish-language telenovelas
Mexican television series based on Spanish television series
Television shows set in Mexico City
Mexican LGBT-related television shows
Sony Pictures Television telenovelas